Chesapeake High School (CHS), is a four-year public high school in Baltimore County, Maryland, United States.

About the school
Chesapeake High School is one of two high schools in Maryland by that name, the other being Chesapeake High School, Anne Arundel County. The Chesapeake High School of Baltimore County is located in southeast corner of the county in Essex, Maryland.  The school borders the school districts of Kenwood High School, Sparrows Point High School, Dundalk High School, and Patapsco High School. Widely known for its Virtual Lab and MCJROTC program.  CHS is a Baltimore County Public School.

Academics
Chesapeake High school received a 45.8 out of a possible 100 points (45%) on the 2018-2019 Maryland State Department of Education Report Card and received a 3 out of 5 star rating, ranking in the 21st percentile among all Maryland schools.

Students
The 2019–2020 enrollment at Chesapeake High School was 961 students.

Chesapeake has recently added a Virtual Learning Environment. This is the first in the country. The school's name has become more widespread and known over the years. It is well known for having a highly successful Magnet program, the highlight being its Engineering Pathway. This pathway is endorsed by the nearby Lockheed Martin facility in Middle River, Maryland.  In the last 10 years, the graduation rate at Chesapeake High School has been on a general downward trend.  it was as high as 94% in 1997 and as low as 72% in 2003.  The dropout rate is about 7%, a rate that is climbing.

About 15% of the students receive special services, a number considered high by Maryland Report Card.

High School Assessment test scores show the school to be performing well.  In 2006, only 29.5% of the students passed algebra, 44.0% passed the biology test, 53.8% passed the government test, and 46.3% passed the English test. However, in 2011, 81.1% of students who took all 4 of the required HSA tests (Algebra/Data Analysis, Biology, Government, and English) have passed the tests.

Athletics

State Champions
 1979 - Softball, Class B

School Activities

Mid-Atlantic Region Champions
 2012 - VEX Robotics, Mid-Atlantic Champions

Notable alumni
 Christi Shake, Playboy Playmate of the Month, May 2002.  Real name is Christina Fistek
 Lamar King, 1999 NFL Seattle Seahawks 1st round draft pick.

See also 
 List of Schools in Baltimore County, Maryland

References

External links
 Chesapeake High School Homepage
 Google Maps

Public high schools in Maryland
Baltimore County Public Schools
Educational institutions established in 1978
Essex, Maryland
Middle States Commission on Secondary Schools
1978 establishments in Maryland